Chunghwa Int'l Communication Network (CCNET) is a telecommunication and networking provider in Taiwan, services includes VOIP, SMS, Payment Gateway, Domain name, web hosting, co-location, IDC.

See also
 List of companies of Taiwan

1997 establishments in Taiwan
Telecommunications companies of Taiwan